is a Japanese singer and YouTuber based in South Korea. She is a former member of AKB48.

Career

2004-2008: Pre-debut
Prior to joining AKB48, Takeuchi signed a contract with Stardust Production in 2004 and appeared in Little By Little's music video for "Ameagari no Kyū na Sakamichi". She was a member of girl group Fruits, born out of the audition tv show "Songs Star !!". In 2008, the group debuted with the single "Koi no Saison" and they disbanded the following year, in 2009.

2009–2018: AKB48 and Produce 48 
Takeuchi passed AKB48 auditions in 2009. While she was a trainee, she was part of the sub-unit Mini Skirt and released the song "Mini Skirt no Yōsei" to promote the arcade game Pretty Rhythm: Mini Skirt, which later featured a likeness of her as a playable character during the Season 2 update. She was promoted to full member status in 2010, and was announced as a member of AKB48's newly formed Team 4 in 2011. In May, Takeuchi was selected to be part of the subunit  "Ojarumaru Sisters" in order to sing "Hatsukoi wa Mitsuru", used as the ending theme of the anime Ojarumaru.

Takeuchi signed to OH Enterprise in 2012. Later that year, Team 4 was disbanded, and Takeuchi was moved to AKB48's Team B. During this time, Takeuchi uploaded home recordings of song covers on social media. In 2014, she began to post song covers on her YouTube channel. In 2021, Her Youtube Channel has amassed 230.000+ subscribers.

In 2018, Takeuchi participated in the South Korean competition series Produce 48 as one of the Japanese contestants from AKB48 and its sister groups. She finished in 17th place.

2018–present: Departure from AKB48, South Korean career 
Four days after the Produce 48 finale, on September 4, 2018, Takeuchi announced her departure from AKB48. Her last performance with AKB48 took place on December 25, 2018, and her contract with OH Enterprise ended on December 31, 2018.

On March 8, 2019, South Korean entertainment company Mystic Story announced that they had signed an official contract with Takeuchi.

On October 22, 2019, Takeuchi released her first solo single, as well as her first Korean single and first single in Mystic Story, titled "My Type" (내 타입) as part of Mystic Story's CEO Yoon Jong Shin's Yoon Jong Shin Monthly Project 2019.

On February 24, 2021, the singer released her second solo single titled "Forbidden Game" (왠지 그럼 안될 것 같아) as part of Yoon Jong Shin's Yoon Jong Shin Monthly Repair Project .

On May 3, 2021, Takeuchi announced the end of her exclusive contract with Mystic Story.

Personal life

Takeuchi was accepted to Keio University in 2013, attending classes at Keio University's Shonan Fujisawa campus while continuing to perform at the AKB48 theater in Akihabara.

Discography

As main artist

As featured artist

Singles with AKB48

Other appearances

Filmography

Film

Television series

Television shows

Game

Radio shows

References

External links 
 Miyu Takeuchi's channel on YouTube

1996 births
Mystic Entertainment artists
Living people
Actresses from Tokyo
AKB48 members
J-pop singers
21st-century Japanese actresses
Japanese expatriates in South Korea
Japanese women pop singers
Japanese idols
Japanese K-pop singers
Japanese-language singers
K-pop singers
Korean-language singers of Japan
Produce 48 contestants
Singers from Tokyo